Tortyra aenescens is a moth of the family Choreutidae. It is known from Ecuador.

References

Tortyra
Moths described in 1905